Proto-Armenian is the earlier, unattested stage of the Armenian language which has been reconstructed by linguists. As Armenian is the only known language of its branch of the Indo-European languages, the comparative method cannot be used to reconstruct its earlier stages. Instead, a combination of internal and external reconstruction, by reconstructions of Proto-Indo-European and other branches, has allowed linguists to piece together the earlier history of Armenian.

Definition
Proto-Armenian, as the ancestor of only one living language, has no clear definition of the term. It is generally held to include a variety of ancestral stages of Armenian between Proto-Indo-European and the earliest attestations of Classical Armenian.

It is thus not a proto-language in the strict sense, but "Proto-Armenian" is a term that has become common in the field.

The earliest testimony of Armenian is the 5th-century Bible translation of Mesrop Mashtots. The earlier history of the language is unclear and the subject of much speculation. It is clear that Armenian is an Indo-European language, but its development is opaque.

In any case, Armenian has many layers of loanwords and shows traces of long language contact with Anatolian languages such as Luwian and Hittite, Hattic, Hurro-Urartian languages, Semitic languages such as Akkadian and Aramaic, and Iranian languages such as Persian and Parthian. Armenian also has been influenced to a lesser extent by Greek and Arabic.

Phonological development of Proto-Armenian
The Proto-Armenian sound changes are varied and eccentric (such as *dw- yielding erk-) and, in many cases, uncertain. That prevented Armenian from being immediately recognized as an Indo-European branch in its own right, and it was assumed to be simply a very divergent Iranian language until Heinrich Hübschmann established its independent character in 1874.

The development of voicing contrasts in Armenian is notable in being quite similar to that seen in Germanic, a fact that was significant in the formation of Glottalic Theory. The Armenian Consonant Shift has often been compared to the famous Grimm's Law in Germanic, because in both cases, Proto-Indo-European voiceless stops became voiceless aspirates (with some complications with regard to Proto-Indo-European *p), the voiced stops became voiceless, and the voiced aspirates became voiced stops. Meanwhile, Armenian shares the vocalization of word initial laryngeals before consonants with Greek and Phrygian: Proto-Indo-European *h₂nḗr ("man", "force") renders Greek anḗr, Armenian ayr from a Proto-Armenian *aynr  and Phrygian anar ("man"), which may be compared to Latin Nero and neriōsus ("strict"), Albanian njeri, Persian nar, Sanskrit nara, and Welsh nerth.

In certain contexts, the aspirated stops are further reduced to w, h or zero in Armenian: Proto-Indo-European (accusative) *pódm̥ "foot" > Armenian otn vs. Greek (accusative) póda, Proto-Indo-European *tréyes "three" > Armenian erekʿ vs. Greek treis.

History 
The origin of the Proto-Armenian language is subject to scholarly debate. Although the Armenian hypothesis would postulate the Armenian language as an in situ development of a 3rd millennium BC Proto-Indo-European language, the more popular Kurgan hypothesis suggests it arrived in the Armenian Highlands either from the Balkans or through the Caucasus. The arrival of such a population who spoke Proto-Armenian in the Armenian Highlands is assumed to have occurred sometime during the Bronze Age or at the latest, during the Bronze Age Collapse around 1200 BC.

One of the theories about the emergence of Armenian in the region is that Paleo-Balkan-speaking settlers related to Phrygians (the Mushki or the retroactively named Armeno-Phrygians), who had already settled in the western parts of the region before the Kingdom of Van was established in Urartu, had become the ruling elite under the Median Empire, followed by the Achaemenid Empire. The existence of Urartian words in the Armenian language and Armenian loanwords into Urartian suggests early contact between the two languages and long periods of bilingualism.

According to the Encyclopedia of Indo-European Culture:

Recent findings in Armenian genetics reveal heavy mixing of groups from the 3000s BC until the Bronze Age collapse. Admixture signals seem to have decreased to insignificant levels after c. 1200 BC, after which Armenian DNA remained stable, which appears to have been caused by Armenians' isolation from their surroundings, and subsequently sustained by the cultural/linguistic/religious distinctiveness that persists until today. The connection between the Mushki and Armenians is unclear as nothing is known of the Mushki language. Some modern scholars have rejected a direct linguistic relationship with Proto-Armenian if the Mushki were Thracians or Phrygians. Additionally, recent findings in genetic research does not support significant admixture into the Armenian nation after 1200 BC, making the Mushki, if they indeed migrated from a Balkan or western Anatolian homeland during or after the Bronze Age Collapse, unlikely candidates for the Proto-Armenians. However, as others have placed (at least the Eastern) Mushki homeland in the Armenian Highlands and South Caucasus region, it is possible that at least some of the Mushki were Armenian-speakers or speakers of a closely related language. Some modern studies show that Armenian is as close to Indo-Iranian as it is to Greek and Phrygian.

An alternate theory suggests that speakers of Proto-Armenian were tribes indigenous to the northern Armenian highlands, such as the Hayasans, Diauehi or Etiuni. Although these groups are only known from references left by neighboring peoples (such as Hittites, Urartians, and Assyrians), Armenian etymologies have been proposed for their names. While the Urartian language was used by the royal elite, the population they ruled was likely multi-lingual, and some of these peoples would have spoken Armenian. This can be reconciled with the Phrygian/Mushki theory if those groups originally came from the Caucasus region or Armenian Highlands.

See also
Armenian hypothesis
Graeco-Armenian
Armeno-Aryan
Armeno-Phrygian languages
Origin of the Armenians
Name of Armenia

References

Sources

 Adjarian, Hrachia. Etymological root dictionary of the Armenian language, vol. I–IV. Yerevan State University, Yerevan, 1971 – 1979.
 
 
 
 
 

 
 
 
K. H. Schmidt, The Indo-European Basis of Proto-Armenian : Principles of Reconstruction, Annual of Armenian linguistics, Cleveland State University, 11, 33-47, 1990.
Werner Winter, Problems of Armenian Phonology I, Language 30, No. 2 (Apr., 1954), pp. 197–201
Werner Winter, Problems of Armenian Phonology II, Language 31, No. 1 (Jan., 1955), pp. 4–8
Werner Winter Problems of Armenian Phonology III, Language 38, No. 3, Part 1 (Jul., 1962), pp. 254–262

External links
Indo-European family tree, showing Indo-European languages and sub branches
Image of Indo-European migrations from the Armenian Highlands

Armenian
Armenian languages
Languages of ancient Anatolia